German Nikolayevich Kudryashov (born 26 September 1964 in Moscow) is a former Russian football player.

References

1964 births
Footballers from Moscow
Living people
Soviet footballers
FC FShM Torpedo Moscow players
FC Dynamo Bryansk players
Russian footballers
FC Kuban Krasnodar players
Russian Premier League players

Association football defenders